The Forest Area (or colloquially "the Forest") is an informal area of suburbs at the most western point of Sydney's Northern Beaches, in the state of New South Wales, in Australia. The seven suburbs within the area are all located within the local government area of Northern Beaches Council,

The area is located amongst the bushland of Ku-ring-gai Chase National Park and Garigal National Park, east of Middle Harbour and borders Sydney's Lower North Shore.

The area has approximately 28,000 residents.

Suburbs

 Forestville
 Frenchs Forest
 Belrose
 Davidson
 Killarney Heights
 Terrey Hills
 Duffys Forest

Localities
 Austlink
 Bantry Bay
 Wakehurst
 Skyline

Transport
The Forest District is served mostly by Forest Coach Lines, as part of the Region 14 Contract. This could also be a considered a way to define the region.
Keolis Downer Northern Beaches run some services.

Schools
The Forest area is home to wide variety of public, Catholic, independent, specialist and alternative education schools:

State Schools
 Kambora Public School
 Davidson High School
 Belrose Public School
 Wakehurst Public School
 Mimosa Public School
 Frenchs Forest Public School
 The Forest High School
 Forestville Public School
 Killarney Heights Public School
 Killarney Heights High School
 Terrey Hills Public School

Catholic Schools
 St Martin De Porres Catholic Primary School
 Our Lady of Good Counsel Catholic Primary School

Independent Schools
 John Colet School
 Covenant Christian School
 Northern Beaches Christian School
 AGBU Alexander Primary School

Specialist Schools
 The German International School
 Sydney Japanese School
 Aspect Vern Barnett School

Alternative Education Schools
 Kamaroi Rudolf Steiner School
 Kinma School
 Forestville Montessori School
 Yanginanook School

Sport
Some of the associations in which people living in the Forest District participate in include:
 Northern Sydney Rebels Gridiron Club 
 Forest District Rugby Union Club 
Forestville Ferrets Junior Rugby League Club 
Forest Lions Junior Australian Football Club (AFL)
 Belrose Eagles Rugby League Club
Belrose Netball Club
Forest Netball Club
Forest/Killarney Soccer (Football) Club
Belrose-Terrey Hills Raiders Soccer (Football) Club
Wakehurst Football Club (Soccer)

References

External links

Regions of Sydney